Forgotten Legends is the first full-length album by Ukrainian black metal band Drudkh. The album's sound and atmosphere have often been compared favourably to those of Burzum. The lyrics to the album are not publicly known and have never been released.

The album was remastered and reissued on Season of Mist's Underground Activists label in 2009 as a digipak with new artwork.

Forgotten Legends was included in an all-time Top 40 Black Metal Albums list by Terrorizer magazine.

Most releases of the album list the song titles only in English, but the iTunes release lists both English and Ukrainian language titles.

Track listing

Personnel
 Roman Saenko - guitars, bass
 Thurios - vocals, keyboards

Guest musicians
 Yuriy Sinitsky - drums

References

2003 debut albums
Drudkh albums
Season of Mist albums